The 1938 Open Championship was the 73rd Open Championship, held 6–8 July at Royal St George's Golf Club in Sandwich, England. In terrible weather conditions that caused scores to soar, Reg Whitcombe prevailed by two strokes over runner-up Jimmy Adams to win his only major title. The purse was £500 with a winner's share of £100.

It was planned to play the Championship at Royal Cinque Ports in nearby Deal, but abnormally high tides that February caused severe flooding to the course, leaving it like "an inland sea several feet deep." The venue was switched to Royal St George's, and Prince's replaced Royal Cinque Ports as the venue for one of the qualifying rounds.

Qualifying took place on 4–5 July, Monday and Tuesday, with 18 holes at St. George's and 18 holes at Prince's. The number of qualifiers was reduced this year to a maximum of 130, and ties for 130th place did not qualify. John Fallon led the qualifiers on 142; the qualifying score was 157 and 120 players advanced, with none from the United States.

Dick Burton, Jack Busson, and Bill Cox shared the 36-hole lead at even par 140, with Whitcombe two strokes back after consecutive rounds of 71. A maximum of 40 players after 36 holes made the cut to play on the final day, and ties for 40th place did not make the cut. It was at 148 (+8) and 37 advanced.

In the last two rounds on Friday, the weather turned from challenging to treacherous. Gale force winds ripped apart the large exhibition tent and scattered debris for a mile around. Alf Padgham drove the green on the  11th hole, while Cyril Tolley cleared the water on the 14th only to have the wind blow his ball back into the hazard. Only seven sub-80 scores were recorded in the final round. The leaders suffered terribly in the conditions: Burton finished 78-85, Busson shot 83-80, while Cox went 84-80. Whitcombe's scores of 75-78 were enough to post a 295 total, two ahead of Adams and three clear of defending champion Henry Cotton.

Past champions in the field

Made the cut  

Source:

Missed the cut 

Source:

Did not advance past qualifying rounds (Monday & Tuesday):
George Duncan (1920), 159.

Did not enter:
 Denny Shute (1933), Gene Sarazen (1932), Tommy Armour (1931),Bobby Jones (1926, 1927, 1930), Walter Hagen (1922, 1924, 1928, 1929).

Round summaries

First round
Wednesday, 6 July 1938

Source:

Second round
Thursday, 7 July 1938

Source:

Third round
Friday, 8 July 1938 (morning)

Source:

Final round
Friday, 8 July 1938 (afternoon)

Source:

Amateurs: Storey (+36), Tolley (+37), Thomson (+39), Pennink (+42).

References

External links
Royal St George's 1938 (Official site)
1938 Open Championship (GolfCompendium.com)

The Open Championship
Golf tournaments in England
Open Championship
Open Championship
Open Championship